Red Sandstone Varied Productions (RSVP) is an Irish performance arts company. The organization, based in County Cork, Ireland, has created public art in festivals throughout Great Britain and Australia. The company is located in County Cork, Ireland.

Background 
Red Sandstone Varied Productions was founded in November 2006, by Yvonne Coughlan. The organisation specialises in public arts participation, theatre, site specific, and promenade-style events. Their first production, entitled The Haunted History Tour, took place at Cork City Gaol and ran for four months. The production presented a theatrical tour covering 100 years of prison life. During a tour of the prison, the viewing public was treated as prisoners who were guided by a warden as they met with other prisoners.

The company has additionally created several promenade-style theatrical events at the old waterworks, in conjunction with Culture Night Cork; Blackrock Castle Observatory, funded by Fáilte Ireland; and Youghal Medieval Festival. Additional work has been presented in Bandon, Ireland; Glasgow, Scotland; Kinsale, Ireland (fishing village); and Melbourne, Australia.

References 

V-Day; The Vagina Monologues Cork/Kinsale. Colette Sheridan. Examiner. 1 May 2009.

Theatre companies in the Republic of Ireland